Michael Parker is an American short story writer, novelist and journalist.

Life
Michael Parker was born in Siler City, North Carolina and grew up in Clinton, North Carolina.  He attended Appalachian State University and graduated from UNC-Chapel Hill with honors in Creative Writing.  Parker received his MFA from the University of Virginia in 1988.

Parker's short fiction has appeared in  "New England Review," "The Oxford American," Five Points, Shenandoah, Carolina Quarterly, Epoch and The Georgia Review and has been anthologized in the Pushcart Prize Stories and New Stories from the South. His stories have received three O. Henry Awards (2005, 2014, 2018).

Parker's nonfiction has appeared in The New York Times Magazine, Runner's World, Trail Runner, Men's Journal, Gulf Coast, Our State, The Oxford American and other magazines.

Parker taught for nearly 30 years at the MFA Creative Writing Program at UNC Greensboro, and now lives in Austin, Texas.  He is on the faculty of the MFA program for writers at Warren Wilson College.

Awards
2020 Thomas Wolfe Prize and Lecture
2019 long-listed for the Andrew Carnegie Medal for Excellence in Fiction for Prairie Fever
2018 O. Henry Prize Story
2014 O. Henry Prize Story
2010 R. Hunt Parker Award for Literature
2006 North Carolina Award for Literature
2005 O. Henry Prize Story
 2005 Hobson Award in Arts and Letters
 2004 Fellowship from the North Carolina Arts Council
 2004 Fellowship from the National Endowment for the Arts
 1994 Sir Walter Raleigh Award for Fiction, for The Geographical Cure
 1993 finalist for the PEN/Hemingway Prize, for Hello Down There

Works
 
 
 
 
 
 
  Prairie Fever, May 2019, Algonquin Books, 
 I Am The Light of This World, November 2022, Algonquin Books. (ISBN 9781643751795)

Short stories
 
 
 Everything, Then and Since, Bull City Press, 2017, ISBN 978-1- 4951-5767-7

References

External links

"Michael Parker: Writing That Really Sings", NPR June 24, 2007
"Michael Parker's website"

20th-century American novelists
21st-century American novelists
American male novelists
Writers from Greensboro, North Carolina
Living people
American male short story writers
20th-century American short story writers
21st-century American short story writers
20th-century American male writers
21st-century American male writers
Novelists from North Carolina
Year of birth missing (living people)